Caryn Agyeman Prempe is a Ghanaian medical practitioner and television presenter. she is the founder of  CERVIVA Ghana.

Education 
Caryn is the daughter of Asantehene,  Otumfuo Nana Osei Tutu II King of Asante. She was named after her paternal grandmother Nana Afia Kobi Serwah Ampem II, the Late Asantehemaa.

She had her secondary education at St Roses Secondary School, Akwatia and  Headington Girls School, Oxford, (United Kingdom). She furthered to University College Of London, Kwame Nkrumah University of Science and Technology School Of Medical Science and Queen Mary University of London to study Biomedical Science, Medicine and Global Public Health respectively.

Career 
Caryn started her medical practices  in Komfo Anokye Teaching Hospital, Kumasi in 2015 then moved to 37 Military Hospital. She is currently the Resident Medical Officer of Claron Health International in Accra.

In 2011, she founded Cerviva Ghana, a non profit that is creating awareness and educating young girls on prevention of cervical cancer. She is the team doctor of the Ghana Black Queens.

She joined GhOne TV in August 2019 as host of "The Late Afternoon Show" to replace Berla Mundi.

External links 
 Linkedin page

References 

Ghanaian medical doctors
Living people
Women physicians
Ghanaian television people
Year of birth missing (living people)